The Gay Notes is a Barbershop quartet that won the 1958 SPEBSQSA international competition.

Discography 
 Strictly Barbershop (1963; LP)

References 

Barbershop quartets
Barbershop Harmony Society